Tarun Dhillon (born 18 August 1994) is an Indian para-badminton player in the SL4 category. Dhillon has been ranked world number 2 in para-badminton men's Singles SL4. He has been qualified for 2020 Summer Paralympics.

Achievements

World Championships 

Men's singles

Men's doubles

Asian Para Games 

Men's singles

BWF Para Badminton World Circuit (4 titles, 4 runners-up) 
The BWF Para Badminton World Circuit – Grade 2, Level 1, 2 and 3 tournaments has been sanctioned by the Badminton World Federation from 2022.

Men's singles

Men's doubles

International Tournaments (2 titles, 3 runners-up) 
Men's singles

Men's doubles

References 

1994 births
Living people
Indian male badminton players
Indian sportspeople
Indian people with disabilities
Indian male para-badminton players
Indian disabled sportspeople
Paralympic badminton players of India
Badminton players at the 2020 Summer Paralympics
Recipients of the Arjuna Award